Eddie Santiago is an eponymous album by Puerto Rican salsa singer Eddie Santiago, released on February 21, 1995. Eddie's comeback album, includes top hits Necesito and Te Amo; his last album under EMI/Capitol Records label.

Track listing
This information adapted from CD Universe.

Credits

Musicians
 Jimmy Morales - congas
 Ángel "Cachete" Maldonado - percussion
 José Luis Dávila
 Pedro Pérez - bass
 Celso Clemente - bongos
 Antonio "Tonito" Vázquez
 Chago Martínez - timbales
 Danny Fuentes - trombone
 Domingo García - piano
 Eddie Santiago - vocals
 Héctor "Pichi" Pérez - percussion, background vocals
 Jesús "Rafi" Torres
 José Luis Dávila - background vocals
 and also Nino Segarra

Production
 Audio Mixers: Papo Sánchez; Tommy Villarini.
 Arrangers: Domingo García; Ernesto Sánchez; Tommy Villarini
 Photographer: Rafi Claudio
 Engineers: Jesús "Papo" Sánchez, José Luis Estrada
 Recording Studio: Telesound Studio, San Juan, Puerto Rico

References

1995 albums
Eddie Santiago albums